Clube Desportivo Estrela is an association football club, based in Amadora, Portugal. It was founded on September 28, 2011 as a successor club to historic club C.F. Estrela da Amadora which folded the same year.

History 
The club was founded by the "Sempre Tricolores" movement, as a way to resurrect the spirit and pay homage to the history of Estrela da Amadora, which was declared insolvent due to financial problems.

The club only worked in the youth leagues until the start of the 2018–19 season. The senior team debuted on September 23, 2018 in a Lisbon FA Cup away match against FC Ota, which the tricolors won 4–1.

In its first season they played in the Lisbon FA First Division Serie 2, level 6 of the Portuguese football league system, and placed 8th in the overall standings out of 16 clubs.

Recent Seasons

See also
C.F. Estrela da Amadora

References

Football clubs in Portugal
Association football clubs established in 2011
2011 establishments in Portugal